Winterburn is a village in the Craven district of North Yorkshire, England.

Winterburn Reservoir is located about a mile from the village, which is situated on Winterburn Beck, the reservoir's outlet.

External links

Winterburn history pages

Villages in North Yorkshire
Craven District